was a Japanese football club from the Okinawa Prefecture, Japan.

History

In 1999, it was established as the football club of "Kariyushi Hotel Group", the largest hotel group in Okinawa Prefecture. Show a good fight to win second place in the "Okinawa Times Cup Prefecture Football Championship" which was also the Emperor's Cup Okinawa Preliminary tournament for that year. After that, they won the "Okinawa TV Cup Prefecture Social League Games".

The team began to aim for J-League participation in earnest in 2001, when they ran the first division of prefectural society league. While inviting former Verdy Kawasaki's Ruy Ramos as a player and technical advisor and organizing the team as a "Kariyushi Football Club of Okinawa Kariyushi", the satellite organization of "Kariyushi Saussha" (affiliated to the Prefectural Social League) established a youth organization. In the same year, they played for the first time as Okinawa Prefecture representative in the 81st Emperor's Cup and will be the Emperor's Cup Okinawa Prefecture for the third consecutive year from that same year.

In 2002 they won the Kyushu Football League and moved to the regional league final tournament where JFL promotion took place, but it was unfortunately lost in the preliminary round. At that time, a group of players including Ramos left and formed a new team FC Ryukyu after a huge disagreement, and the team was in danger of survival. Next year, 2003 started with a lot of new players and director Hisaku Kato aiming for JFL entrance of the wish and entering the future J League, but as long as the year 2004 was sponsored, Kariyoshi's sponsorship was discontinued and the same year 9 in the month following Mr. Kato announced that all the 27 belonging players of that time will leave. At the national soccer football championship held in October of the same year, Honda Ruminoscso Sayama FC (a team of Saitama Manufacturing Co., Ltd.'s Hayato Saitama factory and Sayama factory) struggled to death and ended with a 0-0 equal tie Because it was not done because it was not done), it decorated the victory.

In 2005, we decided to continue the reorganization of the team centred on the satellite organization "Kariyushi Saussha" belonging to the team and to continue participating in the Kyushu league. In the same year, the youth organization was converted into a specified non-profit corporation as "Vicksare Okinawa ".

In 2007, we won the first time in four years since 2003, the right to participate in the 87th Emperor Cup. Despite having competitors such as JFL affiliated FC Ryukyu and the Kyushu League affiliated Okinawa Tokai Bank, they have secured the main competition right for the third consecutive year from that same year.

However, after the end of the season of this year, he did not pay payment paid to de facto professional athletes, but  strengthened its policy to bear the cost of away away (expedition in seven other prefectures of Kyushu). Because the burden of the operation cost of the team is increasing year by year, we will work on cost reduction measures to survive the team, "at least repaying debts in the three-year plan until 2010 and only surviving in the Kyushu league".

In 2008, which was the first year of the reconstruction three-year plan, I played the Kyushu League winning 5 seasons for the first time in the Kyushu league and played the regional league final match, but in the first round 3 races Honda Rock (the same year Kyushu Football League 3, ranked at the top at the national soccer football championships to win the competition). With this, the team became the lowest in the first round and lost, Honda Rock of the opponent became 1st place in the league by this victory, finally ended up as a contrasting result of 2009 promotion of JFL.

In 2009, he played the Kyushu Football League consecutive winning streak since the 2002 and 2003 seasons, but he decided to advance to the regional league final for the second consecutive year, but he lost the preliminary round for the second consecutive year and promoted JFL Missed. Immediately after that announced on 10 December 2009, the club will be dissolved at the end of January 2010. Regarding the reason, President Shigeru Yuanaga noted that it costs around 5000-60 million yen a year for the operating expenses such as player payment and expedition fee, "The biggest reason is not to be able to make operating expenses, Before entering the J League, not only cannot JFL promotion be fulfilled, but the team has become a de facto holiday without waiting for the final year of the team reconstruction three-year plan. The club advanced the negotiations with companies inside and outside the prefecture on the premise of survival, but it was suggested that the company could not return to the Kyushu league if it could not find a company to become a receiver within the prescribed period." Some of the affiliated persons have previously moved to FC Ryukyu separated and independent from Kariyushi.

Etymology
"Kariyushi" is the word in local dialect meaning "happiness" and "auspicious things". "I will aim for the local people's dreams and hopes, and aim for a team to give vitality" was the team's motto.

Kit
Team colours were Orange and Marine Blue, representing the sun and the sea of Okinawa. Goalkeeping kits were green (home) and yellow (away).

League history

Key
Pos. = Position in league; GP = Games played; W(PK)  = Games won(Games won by penalty kicks); L(PK) = Games Lost(Games lost by penalty kicks); F = Goals scored; A = Goals conceded; GD = Goals difference; Pts = Points gained

See also
FC Ryukyu

References

Ryukyu
Defunct football clubs in Japan
Ryukyu
Sports teams in Okinawa Prefecture
2010 disestablishments in Japan
Ryukyu
1999 establishments in Japan